Sverre Holm (14 May 1910 – 23 August 1996) was a Norwegian librarian, novelist, resistance member and sociologist. He was born in Harstad.

Holm published the novel Stor konsert in 1938. In 1940 he helped evacuate the Norwegian gold reserves after the German attack on Norway. He later joined the resistance movement, and was incarcerated in Møllergata 19 in Oslo from December 1944 to May 1945. He was appointed professor at the University of Oslo from 1949, the first professor of Sociology in Norway, and held this position until his retirement in 1980.

References

1910 births
1996 deaths
People from Harstad
Norwegian librarians
Norwegian resistance members
Norwegian sociologists
Academic staff of the University of Oslo
Prisoners and detainees of Germany
Norwegian prisoners and detainees
20th-century Norwegian novelists